The 1968 NCAA Skiing Championships were contested at Mount Werner ski area near Steamboat Springs, Colorado, at the fifteenth annual NCAA-sanctioned ski tournament to determine the individual and team national champions of men's collegiate alpine skiing, cross-country skiing, and ski jumping in the United States.

Wyoming, coached by John Cress, captured their first national championship, edging out seven-time defending champion Denver by less than eight points in the team standings. The previous year, Wyoming was runner-up by less than one point.

Venue

This year's championships were held March 21–23 in Colorado at Mount Werner ski area in Steamboat Springs. The jumping event was at Howelsen Hill.

These were the fourth championships in Colorado, and the first at Steamboat Springs.  Winter Park hosted the state's first two (1956, 1959), followed by Crested Butte in 1966. 

Mount Werner was sold in 1969 and rebranded as "Steamboat" in 1970.

Team scoring

Individual events

Four events were held, which yielded seven individual titles.
Thursday: Slalom 
Friday: Downhill, Cross Country
Saturday: Jumping

See also
List of NCAA skiing programs

References

NCAA Skiing Championships
NCAA Skiing Championships
NCAA Skiing Championships
NCAA Skiing Championships
NCAA Skiing Championships
NCAA Skiing Championships
NCAA Skiing Championships
Skiing in Colorado